Gold: The Best of Spandau Ballet is a greatest hits album by English new wave band Spandau Ballet, released on 4 September 2000 by Chrysalis Records. It contains 17 of the band's biggest hits. The album was re-released on 17 August 2008 with a bonus live DVD.

The track listing below is for the standard US version of the album. Certain alternate releases featured "Raw" and "Be Free with Your Love", two tracks from the band's Heart Like a Sky album (which was not released in the United States), in place of "She Loved Like Diamond."

Track listing

Charts

Certifications

References

2000 greatest hits albums
Chrysalis Records compilation albums
Spandau Ballet albums